The Nth Country Experiment was an experiment conducted by Lawrence Livermore National Laboratory starting in May 1964 which sought to assess the risk of nuclear proliferation. The experiment consisted in paying three recent young physicists who had just received their PhDs, though had no prior weapons experience, to develop a working nuclear weapon design using only unclassified information, and with basic computational and technical support. "The goal of the participants should be to design an explosive with a militarily significant yield", the report on the experiment read, "A working context for the experiment might be that the participants have been asked to design a nuclear explosive which, if built in small numbers, would give a small nation a significant effect on their foreign relations."

The experiment ended on April 10, 1967, after only three man-years of work over two and a half calendar years. According to a heavily redacted declassified version of the summary, it was apparently judged by lab weapons experts that the team had come up with a credible design for the technically more challenging implosion style nuclear weapon. It is likely that they would have been able to design a simpler gun combination weapon even more quickly, though in such a case the limiting factor in developing such a weapon is not usually design difficulty but rather the procurement of material (enriched uranium). The term "Nth Country" referred to the goal in assessing the difficulty in developing basic weapons design (not the development of the weapons themselves) for any potential country with a relatively small amount of technical infrastructure—if the United States was the 1st country to develop nuclear weapons, and the USSR the 2nd, and so on, which would be the Nth country?

Due to the increased amount of publicly available resources regarding nuclear weapons, it is reasonable to assume that a viable weapon design could be reached with even less effort today. However in the history of nuclear weapons, the development of fission weapons was never strongly hindered by basic design questions except in the very first nuclear weapons programs.

The Summary Report of the Nth Country Experiment was declassified—though heavily excised—in 2003.

Summary
In April of 1964, physicists David A. Dobson and David N. Pipkorn were hired by Lawrence Livermore National Laboratory (then known as Livermore Radiation Laboratory) to design a nuclear explosive with "militarily significant yield".

The following year, David Pipkorn dropped out of the project and was replaced by Robert W. Seldon, a captain in the United States Army Reserve. Like Pipkorn and Dobson, Seldon possessed a physics PhD and had no nuclear expertise.

See also
John Aristotle Phillips — a Princeton undergraduate who apparently accomplished a similar feat as those in the Nth Country Experiment in 1977.
Nuclear terrorism
Smyth Report — first U.S. release on nuclear weapons technical information (1945)
United States v. The Progressive, et al. — a court case regarding Howard Morland constructing the design for the hydrogen bomb from public domain documents.

References

External links
Lawrence Radiation Laboratory, University of California, Livermore, "Summary Report of the NTH Country Experiment," W. J. Frank, ed., March 1967. (copy of original report in PDF format)
No Experience Necessary Bulletin of the Atomic Scientists, Dan Stober, March/April 2003, pp. 12
Atomic John A truck driver uncovers secrets about the first nuclear bombs.

Physics experiments
Nuclear secrecy
Nuclear proliferation
1964 in the United States
1964 in science